Grass Arcade is a Japanese rock-band under the Giza Studio label and were active in 1998/1999. Their management office was Ading.

History
The band was formed in 1998 when Seri Kamimine and Keishi Sanada were high school classmates. Later on in the summer of 1998, Kouji Ueno joined and the three then performed together, live on the streets.

In February 1999, they made their major debut on the same day as Giza Studio artists Sweet Velvet and New Cinema Tokage. Their debut single was Brave which was released in two formats: 8cm and 12cm maxi single. The single was used as an opening theme for Anime television series Kindaichi Shounen no Jikenbo. The single reached number 36 in the Weekly Oricon rankings, charted for 2 weeks and sold over 10,000 copies.

In the same month they released their first mini album "!" under the indie label, Garage Indies Zapping Association. The mini album includes the demo version of the single Brave, the b-side track So Long and two cover songs by the bands Happy End and The Spiders.

In June 1999, they released their second and final single, Butterfly which was used as a theme song for NNS television program Tokoroteki Dazoku Kousa. Bassist Hiroyuki Wakita then joined shortly afterwards.

In July 1999, there were plans to release a debut album, Sing-a-horic (with the disc code GZCA-1010), however during the recording the band disbanded and as result the album was never released.

In August 1999, Hiroyuki left the band and Grass Arcade then disbanded. Hiroyuki would then join the band New Cinema Tokage as their new bassist in June 2000.

In 2014, when they reached the 15th anniversary of their debut, Seri and Keishi performed under the name Grass Arcade in a live session called QUNIWO☆SONIC in live house Ogimachi Para-dice as guest members of the band Robo&Peace. Ueno and Hiroyuki weren't involved.

Members
Seri Kamimine (上峰芹) - vocals
Keishi Sanada (早灘圭志) - drums
Kouji Ueno (上野幸司) - guitar
Hiroyuki Wakita (脇田啓行) - bass

Discography

Mini albums

Singles

Unreleased studio album

Magazine appearances
From Music Freak Magazine:
Vol.51 1999/February
Vol.55 1999/June
Vol.56 1999/July

From J-Rock Magazine:
1999/03
1999/04
1999/08

References

External links
Official website by Being (in Japanese) 
Oricon profile (in Japanese)()

Being Inc. artists
Living people
Japanese rock music groups
Anime musicians
Musical groups established in 1998
Musical groups disestablished in 1999
Year of birth missing (living people)